Shawn Douglas Bain Bowman (born December 9, 1984) is a Canadian former professional baseball third-baseman and current coach.

Early life
Bowman attended Dr. Charles Best Secondary School in Coquitlam, British Columbia and was the starting third-baseman for the Coquitlam Reds of the B.C. Premier Baseball League.  Bowman also played shortstop for Team Canada at the 2002 World Junior Baseball Championship, where he was named to the tournament All-Star Team after hitting 12 RBIs in 5 games.

Professional career
Although Bowman was drafted by the Mets in the 12th round (357th overall) in the 2002 Major League Baseball draft, they failed to agree upon a contract in time for him to play during the 2002 season.  Bowman would begin his professional career during the 2003 season when he spent time with both the Kingsport Mets and the Brooklyn Cyclones.  He went on to have a successful 2004 season playing for the Capital City Bombers where he hit .258, had 19 home runs and 69 RBIs in 116 games played.  However, he began to develop chronic back problems during the 2005 season while playing for the St. Lucie Mets of the Florida State League, and was only healthy enough to play in 125 games from over the next three seasons.

A healthy Bowman returned to the St. Lucie lineup on June 17, 2008, and would go on to hit .340 over the next 26 games before earning a promotion to the AA Binghamton Mets.  Although he began his Binghamton career with an 8-game hitting streak, he would only go on to hit .214 over his final 84 at-bats of the 2008 season.

Although he was on Canada's roster for the 2009 World Baseball Classic, Bowman did not make an appearance during either of the team's games.

Bowman was claimed off waivers by the Toronto Blue Jays on April 14, 2010.

On January 18, 2019, he became Dominican Summer League Pirates 2 manager.

References

External links

1984 births
Living people
Baseball people from British Columbia
Baseball players at the 2011 Pan American Games
Binghamton Mets players
Brooklyn Cyclones players
Canadian expatriate baseball players in the United States
Capital City Bombers players
Dunedin Blue Jays players
Gulf Coast Braves players
Gwinnett Braves players
Jacksonville Suns players
Kingsport Mets players
Minor league baseball managers
Mississippi Braves players
New Orleans Zephyrs players
New Hampshire Fisher Cats players
Pan American Games gold medalists for Canada
Pan American Games medalists in baseball
Sportspeople from New Westminster
St. Lucie Mets players
World Baseball Classic players of Canada
2009 World Baseball Classic players
Medalists at the 2011 Pan American Games